Lazar "Lazo" M. Kostić (Serbian Cyrillic: Лазар Лазо М. Костић; 15 March 1897 – 17 January 1979) was a Montenegrin Serb nationalist writer, economist, statistician and doctor of law.

Biography
Kostić was born on 15 March 1897 in Vranovići near Kotor, at the time part of the Kingdom of Dalmatia, Austria-Hungary (now Montenegro) to Marko Kostić and Darinka Petković. His father was an Orthodox priest, coming from a family with long monastic tradition. His mother was a daughter of a notable captain Savo Petković, personal skipper of Prince Nikola's yacht Sybil, whom he took over after Prince Nikola bought it from Jules Verne. Lazo was professor at University of Belgrade School of Law at Subotica and Law university in Ljubljana and dean of University of Belgrade.

After the Axis invasion of Yugoslavia in April 1941, Kostić joined the German-appointed Commissioner Government, which was led by Milan Aćimović. The Commissioner Administration was "a simple instrument of the [German] occupation regime", that "lacked any semblance of power". Kostić was the commissioner for transportation from 30 April until 10 July 1941 when he resigned. After that, he refused to take part in the successor puppet government, the Government of National Salvation led by Milan Nedić.

Kostić left Belgrade before its fall to the Yugoslav Partisans and the Soviet Red Army in October 1944. He was charged with collaboration In absentia on 6 March 1945. Following the war, he was a defender of the Chetnik movement of Draža Mihailović, and wrote several books, advancing several controversial claims, including that Bosnian Muslims are Serbs, and that war-time Serbia was free of antisemitism.

Since the fall of communism, Kostić's works have become readily available in Serbia and many of them have been reprinted. The nationalist Serbian Radical Party has reprinted several of Kostić's works, with party leader Vojislav Šešelj personally editing the publications.

Works
Megalomanija jednog malog i neskrupuloznog naroda (Self- exaltation of a Small and Unscrupulous People), Srpska knjiga, 1955
Sporni predeli Srba i Hrvata, American Institute for Balkan Affairs, 1957
Obmane i izvrtanja kao podloga narodnosti : Srpsko-hrvatski odnosi poslednjih godina, Srpska narodna odbrana, 1959
Ćirilica i srpstvo: Kulturno-politička studija, American Institute for Balkan Affairs, 1960
O srpskom karakteru Boke Kotorske, 1961
Srpska Vojvodina i njene manjine : demografsko-etnografska studija, Srpski kulturni klub "sv. Sava", 1962
Nove jugoslovenske "narodnosti" : demografsko-etnografska studija, Srpski kulturni klub "sv. Sava", 1965
Šta su Srbi mislili o Bosni : političko-istorijska studija, 1965
Etnički odnosi Bosne i Hercegovine, Iskra, 1967
Hrvatska zverstva u drugom svetskom ratu: prema izjavama njihovih saveznika, Srpska narodna odbrana, 1974
Nasilno prisvajanje dubrovačke kulture : kulturno-istorijska i etnopolitička studija
The holocaust in the independent state of Croatia: an account based on German, Italian and the other sources, Liberty, 1981
Srbi i Jevreji, R.M. Nikašinović and I.M. Pavlović, 1988

See also
 Djoko Slijepčević
 Dimitrije Najdanović

Notes

References

1897 births
1979 deaths
People from Kotor
People from the Kingdom of Dalmatia
Government ministers of Serbia
Serbian nationalists
Austro-Hungarian military personnel of World War I
Serbian collaborators with Nazi Germany
Serbian people of World War II
Serbia under German occupation
Academic staff of the University of Belgrade
Academic staff of the University of Ljubljana
Serbs of Montenegro
Montenegrin collaborators with Nazi Germany